Law enforcement in Latvia is under the jurisdiction of the Ministry of the Interior, which is composed of the State Police, Security Police and State Border Guard branches.

In 2003, the State Police consisted of 8,222 officers.

See also
 Corruption Prevention and Combating Bureau

References

External links
Latvia Ministry of the Interior
Interpol entry on Latvian police and judicial systems
Latvia State Police